Sididae is a family of ctenopods in the order Diplostraca. There are about 6 genera and at least 20 described species in Sididae. Some Sididae are non-native species.

Genera
 Diaphanosoma Fischer, 1850
 Latona Straus, 1820
 Latonopsis G. O. Sars, 1888
 Penilia Dana, 1849
 Pseudosida Herrick, 1884
 Sida Straus, 1820

References

Cladocera
Crustacean families